The  class consisted of four pre-dreadnought battleships built for the German  (Imperial Navy), the first modern battleships of the fleet. They followed a series of small coastal defense ships, and though in retrospect they anticipated the buildup that created the High Seas Fleet, they were ordered as part of a construction program that reflected the strategic and tactical confusion that affected many navies in the 1880s. The design process that resulted in the  class was very lengthy, with proposals that ranged from outdated casemate ships to versions with two twin-gun turrets placed side by side. The designers ultimately settled on ships that were armed with an unusual main battery of six  guns at a time when all foreign battleships were built with four or fewer heavy guns.

All four ships served with I Squadron of the German fleet for the first several years of their careers, with  the squadron flagship. During this period, they conducted routine training exercises and visited foreign countries, frequently in company with Kaiser Wilhelm II aboard his yacht. In 1900, they were deployed to China to help combat the Boxer Uprising, but they arrived after the bulk of the fighting was over and thus saw little action there. After returning to Germany they were modernized beginning in 1902, thereafter resuming their peacetime activities.  and  remained in service with the German fleet until 1912, when they were laid up. The now-Ottoman ships saw extensive service during the First Balkan War, providing fire support to Ottoman ground forces fighting in Thrace, as well as engaging the Greek fleet at the Battles of Elli and Lemnos in December 1912 and January 1913, respectively.

Following the outbreak of World War I, the German ships were reactivated for use as guard ships protecting the German North Sea coast. She became a barracks ship until 1950 when she was sold for scrap, and was slowly dismantled over the following decade.

Background

A general of the Imperial German Army, he was inexperienced in naval matters and he convened a council with senior naval officers on 16 January 1884 to gather opinions on future naval construction programs. The plan governed the size and composition of the German fleet, calling for fourteen ocean-going ironclad warships, a total that was reached with the launching of the casemate ship  in 1884. At the January council meeting, Caprivi emphasized the need for careful consideration of new designs, noting that the navy could not afford "the luxury of failed experiments", owing to parliamentary refusal to authorize funding for new ships.

Concerns with a two-front war against France and Russia dominated Caprivi's thinking, which resulted in his decision to opt for a strategy of coastal defense in the memorandum; he noted that without a powerful battle fleet, the sea-going ironclads would have little utility against the numerically superior French fleet. He also pointed out that at the time, shell designers and armor manufacturers were competing to defeat each other, which necessitated spiraling costs for navies that attempted to keep pace with the latest technological developments. He also saw that the torpedo could be used to easily sink large armored warships and would be an effective weapon for coastal defense. As a result of these considerations, Caprivi recommended building a large number of smaller coastal defense ships and torpedo boats to defend Germany's coastline in the event of war. Aware of parliamentary objections to increased naval spending, he avoided plans for the construction of expensive battleships. Indeed, the 1870s and 1880s marked a period of tactical and strategic confusion in naval thinking in the world's major navies for the same reasons that Caprivi had highlighted in his memorandum.

Despite the memorandum submitted to the  that eschewed capital ship construction, Caprivi secretly discussed new ironclads at length with senior naval officers. He instructed  (KAdm—Rear Admiral) Max von der Goltz, then the Director of the Admiralty's Naval Department, to prepare a list of thirteen questions concerning the characteristics of a new capital ship and then to circulate them among naval officers to gather views on the topic. The questions included requirements for speed, cruising radius, maximum draft, whether sailing rigs should be included, the number, type, and arrangement of main battery guns, and the armor type and layout. Goltz met with several other officers, including Hans von Koester, August von Thomsen, Hans Sack, Wilhelm Büchsel, Carl Barandon, Conrad von Bodenhausen, Gustav Schmidt, and Curt von Maltzahn on 20 October 1885 to discuss the questions. Other questions, including the speed and crew size, were left unanswered.

At the same time, Caprivi requested design proposals from the Naval Construction Office, which submitted plans for ships that ranged in size from small  coastal defense ships armed with a battery of two  guns to heavily-armed  ocean-going battleships equipped with seven 30.5 cm guns. The  still refused to authorize expensive new ships, especially in light of the cost of creating the Kaiser Wilhelm Canal, though Caprivi was able to convince enough members that the entrances of the canal would be vulnerable to attack and that coastal defense ships would be necessary to guard them. The  accordingly approved funds for ten such vessels, which ultimately became the six - and two s; the last two vessels were later cancelled in 1893. The first ship, was authorized for the 1887–1888 budget year. In early 1887,  (Captain at Sea) Friedrich von Hollmann, who was now Caprivi's chief of staff, presented plans for the 1889–1890 budget year that included the construction of one of the sea-going battleships requested by Goltz's committee, with a second vessel scheduled for the 1892–1893 year.

In 1888, Kaiser Wilhelm I died and his successor, the terminally ill Kaiser Friedrich III, remained on the throne for just 99 days before passing away as well. The new Kaiser, Wilhelm II, was an ardent supporter of the navy, which was to have profound impacts on the future of the service. The navy initially requested a pair of battleships in line with Hollmann's projected budget, but Wilhelm II intervened to demand four new ships for the 1889–1890 budget. German Chancellor Otto von Bismarck secured funding for the ships through the larger army expansion bill, though the  delayed funding for the latter three members of the class.

Design 

The design for the  class was prepared by Chief Constructor Alfred Dietrich; he originally used  as a starting point. In his first memorandum on the project, he noted that the  design would have to be enlarged to provide room for more powerful propulsion machinery and increased coal storage, and armor would have to be strengthened, among other changes. Dietrich met with Monts on 15 August, who requested that the new ship be armed with four  guns, since the 26 cm guns were perceived to be too small to effectively engage the latest Russian ships being built. This version was submitted two days later to Wilhelm II, who approved it.

He briefly examined the possibility of mounting two turrets forward, similar to the  design, but the beam necessary to accommodate guns of that size along with the hull armor would have made the ship too large to be docked in most German dry docks. Variants with four to six single-gun turrets were also prepared, as was a version with two twin turrets and two single-gun wing turrets.

As Dietrich continued to work on the plans, he examined other foreign contemporaries, including the French  ironclad battleships that carried three single-gun turrets, all on the centerline. He proposed an armament of six heavy guns in three two-gun turrets in the same arrangement. While this would reduce the end-on fire capability, the RMA determined that the heavier broadside outweighed the reduction in firing arcs ahead or astern. The ships were to have carried a uniform battery of six 28 cm MRK L/35 guns, but during construction a longer 40-caliber version, the MRK L/40 variant, became available. The fore and aft turrets received the longer guns, but the center turret did not have enough space to fit them owing to the closeness of the aft superstructure, so the shorter guns were retained.

The s were the first ocean-going capital ships to be built for the German fleet in almost twenty years. Their construction caused significant concern in Russia, which was a possible naval opponent in the Baltic Sea; the Russians decided to strengthen their Baltic Fleet with as many as ten new battleships, though funding proved to be insufficient and the program was significantly pared down.

General characteristics 

As was the standard for German warships of the period, the hulls of the -class ships were constructed from both transverse and longitudinal steel frames, over which the steel side plates were riveted. The vessels had 13 watertight compartments and a double bottom that ran for 48% of the length of the hull. Their hulls featured a tumblehome shape above the main deck, and as was common for warships of the era, a ram bow. The ships had a raised forecastle deck that extended to the aft funnel, thereafter reducing to the main deck level.

The German navy regarded the ships as excellent sea-boats and the s had easy motion. They were also responsive to commands from the bridge and had a moderate turning circle. Despite their generally positive handling characteristics, the ships were "wet" at high speeds despite the forecastle deck and suffered from severe pitching. The ships lost up to 30% of their speed at hard rudder.

The ships' crew numbered 38 officers and 530 enlisted men, though while serving as the squadron flagship the standard crew was augmented by an additional 9 officers and 54 men. After their refits, their standard crew consisted of 30 officers and 561 enlisted sailors, with an additional 9 officers and 48 enlisted men as flagships. They carried a number of small boats, including a pair of picket boats, two launches, one pinnace, two cutters, two yawls, and two dinghies.

Machinery 

The ships' propulsion system consisted of two 3-cylinder triple-expansion engines with steam provided by twelve coal-fired, transverse Scotch marine boilers. The boilers were also split into two boiler rooms and they were ducted into a pair of funnels. Electrical power was provided by three generators. The equipment varied from ship to ship; power output ranged from 72.6 to 96.5 kilowatts at 67 volts. The ships each had a single rudder.

Armament

Main battery
The -class battleships carried a battery of six 28 cm guns of two different calibers; the forward and aft turrets mounted 40-caliber guns while the amidships turret required the use of shorter 35-caliber guns to allow the turret to rotate. The turrets consisted of a rotating platform that held the guns, protected by an armored barbette on all sides.

Propellant charges consisted of brown powder. Both types of guns used the same C/92 barbette mount that allowed for depression to −4 degrees and elevation to 25 degrees.

The turrets were hydraulically operated and required the rotating gun houses to return to the centerline to reload the guns. In their original configuration, the guns had a rate of fire of one shot every three minutes, but after their refits in the early 1900s, the ships' loading equipment was modernized to improve the rate to one shot per minute. Ammunition magazines stored a total of 352 shells; these were  projectiles that had a  bursting charge.

Secondary and tertiary guns
The  class's secondary armament initially consisted of six  SK L/35 quick-firing guns in individual casemates arranged in an armored battery below the forward superstructure. These guns had recently been adapted by Krupp from existing guns to employ quick-firing technology. Their rate of fire was theoretically 10 rounds per minute, but in practice it was limited to 7.5 shots per minute. During their modernization, another pair of guns was added and ammunition storage increased from 600 rounds to 1,184 shells, which were a mixture of armor piercing and high explosive (HE) rounds.

For close-range defense against torpedo boats, the ships also carried eight  SK L/30 quick-firing guns. These were also mounted in casemates, four in sponsons abreast the forward main battery turret and four in the rear superstructure. These guns were supplied with a total of 2,000 shells, though as with the 10.5 cm guns, ammunition storage was increased during the modernization, to 2,384 rounds. These were originally all C/83 common shells, though they were replaced by C/01 semi-armor-piercing (SAP) shells in 1901, and C/07 shells in 1907, which came in HE and SAP varieties. Rate of fire was theoretically fourteen shots per minute, but in practice it was limited to ten rounds per minute.

Torpedo tubes
In the 1880s, naval tacticians assumed most battles would devolve into a melee, where torpedoes would become the decisive weapon, since they could damage a heavily armored ship below the waterline where the belt armor did not protect it. While the ships were under construction, Hollmann argued in a February 1891 memorandum that the original torpedo armament was not sufficient. He suggested that two torpedo tubes should be installed in the bow below the waterline to increase the forward firepower in the expected melee. There was no room in the bow to fit two torpedo tubes, however, so they were fitted in above-water mounts. At the same time, many foreign navies were adopting larger torpedoes, including the Royal Navy, which had shifted from its standard  torpedo to a  version. The Germans followed suit; the older  C/84 torpedo was replaced with a much more powerful 45 cm C/91 version.

The ships received six 45 cm torpedo tubes, four of which were mounted on the sides of the ship in above-water swivel mounts. The other two were in the bow, also above the waterline. The tubes were supplied with a total of 16 torpedoes, which carried a  warhead. They had a top speed of  compared to the  speed of the C/84 torpedoes; this allowed the torpedoes to travel  in 24 seconds instead of the 30 seconds it would have taken the older torpedoes, making aiming at moving targets significantly easier.

Armor 

The compound armor was constructed by welding hardened steel together with more flexible wrought iron plates to take advantage of the hardness of steel and the greater flexibility of wrought iron to break up and then contain incoming shells. Krupp's nickel steel armor was based on the Harvey process, which enriched the upper layers of the steel with carbon. The process hardened the outer layer while retaining greater flexibility at the back of the plate; the fact that the new armor plate consisted of a single forging instead of multiple plates welded together gave it greater strength. This allowed the use of thinner (and thus lighter) armor belts that provided the same level of protection, which in turn permitted more comprehensive protection for the same weight of armor. Some portions of  did receive the new Krupp armor, including the barbettes that held the fore and center main battery turrets. All four ships retained teak backing to their armor belts. The teak was used to help absorb the shock of a torpedo or naval mine detonation.

The side protection system followed the so-called "French principle", using a narrow, full-length armored belt to protect the hull, rather than a shorter citadel system that only protected a ship's ammunition magazines and propulsion machinery spaces. Below the waterline, the armored belt was significantly thinner; like the upper belt, it tapered toward the ends. The teak backing for the belt amounted to 200 mm, and the whole assembly was bolted together.

The forward conning tower had 300 mm sides and a  roof. The 10.5 cm and 8.8 cm guns received gun shields that consisted of two plates of steel bolted together; each shield consisted of a  plate and a  plate.

Modifications

Over the course of their careers, the ships underwent a series of modifications. Beginning in 1896, the German navy began to acquire  Maxim guns to supplement the 8.8 cm guns in anti-torpedo-boat defense. Though these were very light weapons, firing a  projectile, the Germans believed that a hail of fire would prevent torpedo boat crews from approaching close enough to launch their torpedoes. The guns had a maximum rate of fire of 100 rounds per minute, but using deliberate fire the rate was 33 shots per minute. Four of these guns were installed in the fighting tops of the ships' masts. Before their deployment to East Asia in 1900, all four ships received wireless telegraphy sets, making them the first ships of the German fleet to carry radio sets.

Between 1902 and 1904, the four ships were extensively modified. During the modernization, a second, armored conning tower was added in the aft superstructure, along with a gangway. The work included increasing the ship's coal storage capacity and adding another pair of 10.5 cm guns. The plans had initially called for the center 28 cm turret to be replaced with an armored battery of medium-caliber guns, but this proved to be prohibitively expensive. The ships' torpedo armament was significantly reduced; two of the broadside tubes were removed, as were both bow tubes, while one above-water tube was installed in the stern in a trainable mounting. Total torpedo storage amounted to five torpedoes. Their masts had their searchlight platforms removed.

Later in her career,  received two searchlights mounted on the roof of the fighting top of her foremast, along with a third on the roof of her aft bridge. An enclosed spotting top was installed in 1915.

Construction 

As the members of the class entered service in late 1893, they conducted sea trials that lasted into 1894. s tests revealed problems with her propulsion machinery that required lengthy repairs for much of 1894.  suffered a boiler explosion during sea trials on 16 February 1894 that killed forty-four men: twenty-five crew members, eighteen shipyard workers, and one from the commission evaluating the trials. The accident had been caused by an incorrectly manufactured valve in the starboard engine.

Service history

Early career

As the members of the class entered service beginning in 1894, they were assigned to I Division of I Squadron, with  becoming the squadron flagship. Throughout the rest of the 1890s, the ships conducted routine training exercises, visits to foreign countries, and training cruises. Maneuvers included tactical training, shooting practice, and joint operations with Imperial German Army units to practice coastal defense. The ships were involved in a number of accidents:  collided with the aviso  in August 1896 and in November 1899,  struck a submerged rock and was badly damaged. As the largest warships of the German fleet, they frequently escorted Wilhelm II's yacht  on state visits or to sailing regattas, most notably Cowes Week in Britain.

During the Boxer Uprising in 1900, Chinese nationalists laid siege to the foreign embassies in Peking and murdered Baron Clemens von Ketteler, the German minister. The widespread violence against westerners in China led to an alliance between Germany and seven other Great Powers: the United Kingdom, Italy, Russia, Austria-Hungary, the United States, France, and Japan. By the time the German fleet had arrived in late August 1900, the siege of Peking had already been lifted by forces from other members of the Eight-Nation Alliance that had formed to deal with the Boxers. As a result, the task force suppressed local uprisings around Kiaochow. In the end, the operation cost the German government more than 100 million marks. On 26 May 1901, the German high command recalled the expeditionary force to Germany, arriving in mid-August.

After returning from China, the ships resumed their typical peacetime routine. By late 1907, all four members of the class were reduced to the Reserve Squadron, with  again serving as the flagship.

and 

 and  remained in the Reserve Squadron through 1911, being periodically reactivated to participate in annual fleet maneuvers in III Squadron.  briefly served with the Training and Experimental Ships Unit in mid-1911. At the end of the year, they were decommissioned once again, their place in the unit being taken by other battleships as the latest dreadnought battleships entered service.

They were mobilized in August 1914 following the outbreak of World War I. They were assigned to V Battle Squadron, which was tasked with coastal defense in the North Sea to guard against attacks by the British Royal Navy. V Squadron was moved to the Baltic in September to support an amphibious assault against Russian forces in Windau, but a shortage of transports led to the cancellation of the operation.

V Squadron was disbanded in January 1916, and  steamed to Danzig where she was decommissioned and converted into a barracks ship. She was to be converted into a target ship, but the war ended before work could be completed. Owing to the severe shortage of merchant shipping after the war, plans were proposed to rebuild  into a freighter, but the plans came to nothing. Both ships were struck from the naval register on 13 May 1919 and sold to ship breakers, both vessels being dismantled in Danzig.

and 
At the outbreak of the Italo-Turkish War in September 1911, the Ottoman fleet withdrew into the safety of the Dardanelles to avoid confrontation with the much stronger Italian  (Royal Navy). Having been neglected by their crews during the conflict, they were in even worse condition by the end of the war in October 1912, with their telephone systems out of service and many of their watertight doors unable to close. Their rangefinders and the ammunition hoists for their main battery guns had been removed.

With the Italo-Turkish War all but over by early October, the Balkan League declared war on the Ottomans, having been encouraged by Italy's easy victory. Both ships were pressed into action, initially to support Ottoman forces defending against the advance of Bulgarian troops in Thrace. In December, the fleet was reorganized to challenge the Greek Royal Hellenic Navy in the Aegean Sea;  was the flagship of the armored division. The Ottomans retreated back to the Dardanelles in disorder. The Ottoman fleet spent the rest of the war operating in the Sea of Marmora and the Black Sea against Bulgarian forces, helping to protect the Çatalca garrison through March.

By March 1915, the Ottoman command had decided to keep only one vessel on station at a time so vessels could be withdrawn for maintenance and resupply. In April, the British and French fleets launched the Gallipoli campaign. The British submarine  torpedoed and sank  on 8 August as she moved into position to bombard Allied forces fighting at Gallipoli. The sinking caused the Ottomans to withdraw , and she remained out of service until January 1918 when she was reactivated to tow the battlecruiser , which had run aground after the Battle of Imbros.

 was again decommissioned in October and remained out of service until she underwent a refit in 1924–1925, thereafter serving as a training ship, by this time with only one of her main battery turrets aboard the vessel. Decommissioned for the final time in 1933, she spent the next seventeen years as a barracks ship, ultimately being slowly broken up between 1950 and 1957.

Footnotes

Notes

Citations

References

Further reading
 
 
 

Battleship classes
 
Brandenburg